New Guwahati railway station is a railway station in Guwahati, Assam. Its code is NGC. It serves Guwahati City. The station has no platform. It's just a passing through station with no train stopping. It's Assam's first BG diesel locomotive shed. The area serves as a passenger and goods train yard.

References

External links

Transport in Guwahati
Railway stations in Guwahati
Lumding railway division